Tariq Mukhtar Saeed (born 26 January 1983) is a Sudanese football defender who currently plays for El-Merreikh.

Career
He was transferred from Almal Atbara to El-Merreikh in December 2009. Mukhtar scored his first goal for El-Merreikh in the league against Jazeerat Al Feel in the last minute in which El-Merreikh won 3:0.

International career
He was a member of the Sudan national football team and scored his first national goal against Palestine in which it finished in a 1–1 draw in Omdurman.

International goals
Scores and results list Sudan's goal tally first.

References 

1983 births
Living people
Sudanese footballers
Association football midfielders
Al-Merrikh SC players
Sudan international footballers
Alamal SC Atbara players
Al-Hilal Club (Omdurman) players